James Urban (born December 1, 1973) is an American football coach who was the quarterbacks coach for the Baltimore Ravens  of the National Football League (NFL). He previously served as an assistant coach for the Cincinnati Bengals and Philadelphia Eagles.

Playing career
Urban played college football at Washington and Lee. He played wide receiver and kick returner for the Generals.

Coaching career

College
From 1997–1998, Urban was a graduate assistant at Clarion University of Pennsylvania. He was the Director of Football Administration at the University of Pennsylvania in 1999, and was the Director of Football Operations from 2000–2003.

Professional

Philadelphia Eagles
Urban became a coaching intern for the Philadelphia Eagles during training camp in 2003. The assistant to head coach Andy Reid tore a patellar tendon during camp, and Urban took over his duties while he recovered. He was promoted to that position full-time in 2004. He was promoted to offensive assistant/quality control coach on February 20, 2007. He was promoted to quarterbacks coach in 2009 after Pat Shurmur left to be the offensive coordinator of the St. Louis Rams. When the Eagles signed Michael Vick during the preseason in 2009, Urban and offensive quality control coach Doug Pederson helped acclimate Vick to the offensive scheme. Urban was promoted to assistant offensive coordinator on February 8, 2011.

Cincinnati Bengals
Shortly after his promotion to assistant offensive coordinator with the Eagles, Urban took the Cincinnati Bengals' wide receivers coach position on February 21, 2011.

Baltimore Ravens
On January 5, 2018, Urban was hired by the Baltimore Ravens to be their new quarterbacks coach. During his tenure he has worked with quarterback Lamar Jackson on improving Jackson's delivery of a football, footwork and familiarity with the Ravens new offense.

References

External links
Philadelphia Eagles bio

1973 births
Living people
Philadelphia Eagles coaches
Cincinnati Bengals coaches
Baltimore Ravens coaches
Penn Quakers football coaches
Clarion Golden Eagles football coaches
Washington and Lee Generals football players